Okanagodes is a genus of cicadas in the family Cicadidae. There are at least two described species in Okanagodes.

Species
These two species belong to the genus Okanagodes:
 Okanagodes gracilis Davis, 1919
 Okanagodes terlingua Davis, 1932

References

Further reading

 
 
 
 
 
 
 

Articles created by Qbugbot
Tibicinini
Cicadidae genera